The list of Anglican churches in Macau is as follows:

Parish 
 St. Mark's Church

Missions 

 Morrison Chapel
 St. Paul's Church
 Holy Cross Church
 St. Stephen's Church

See also 

 Missionary Area of Macau
 Religion in Macau
 Hong Kong Sheng Kung Hui
 List of Anglican churches in Hong Kong
 List of Anglican churches
 Anglican Communion

References

External links 
 Hong Kong Sheng Kung Hui
 Missionary Area of Macau
 Hong Kong (Anglicans Online)

Hong Kong Sheng Kung Hui
Macau, Anglican
Churches in Macau
Macau-related lists
Churches in Macau
Lists of religious buildings and structures in China
Lists of buildings and structures in Macau